3 Suisses is a French mail order and e-commerce company, with headquarters in Villeneuve-d'Ascq. Everett Hutt is the current CEO as of 2022.

Since 1981, Otto GmbH owned a 51% in the company and its only shareholder since January 2014.
	
In 1987, 3 Suisses and L'Oréal founded Le Club des Créateurs de Beauté specializing in mail order sales of cosmetic products.

In 2010, Alexandre Vauthier created a clothing line for 3 Suisses.

See also
 La Redoute

References

Retail companies of France
Otto family